The ICL International was a golf tournament in South Africa as part of the South African Tour. International stars like Gary Player, Nick Faldo, and Nick Price won the event. 

The tournament was initially played at Kensington Golf Club in Johannesburg. It moved to Zwartkop Country Club in Pretoria from 1984 to 1995.

Winners 
 1976 (Jan)  Peter Townsend
 1976 (Dec)  Hugh Baiocchi
 1977  Gary Player
 1978  Dale Hayes
 1979  Nick Faldo
 1980  Harold Henning
 1981  Simon Hobday
 1982 No tournament (moved from November to February)
 1983  Wayne Westner
 1984  David Feherty
 1985  Nick Price
 1986  Gavan Levenson
 1987  Tony Johnstone
 1988  Tony Johnstone
 1989  Chris Williams
 1990  Gavan Levenson
 1991  Fulton Allem
 1992  Kevin Johnson
 1993  Nick Price
 1994  Nick Price
 1995  Ashley Roestoff

References

Golf tournaments in South Africa
Former Sunshine Tour events